The Suzuki DR125 is a  four-stroke motorcycle manufactured by Suzuki.

References

External links 
 Suzukicycles.org

DR125
Motorcycles introduced in the 1980s